Lilwall is a surname. Notable people with the surname include:

Rob Lilwall (born 1976), British-born adventurer
Steve Lilwall (born 1970), English footballer